The Belorussian Communist Organisation (abbreviated БКО, translit. It emerged from the organisation 'Young Belarus' (Маладая Беларусь), which was founded in the Minsk Teaching Institute in 1917. In 1918 the group became an autonomous section of the Belorussian Party of Socialists - Revolutionary. On 1 January the group broke away and formed the BKO as a separate party. In August 1920 BKO merged into the Communist Party of Lithuania and Belorussia.

References

Communist parties in Belarus
Defunct political parties in Belarus
Political parties of the Russian Revolution